Édgar Ángel Vivar Villanueva (born 28 December 1948) is a Mexican actor and comedian. He is best known for his characters of Señor Barriga and his son Ñoño from El Chavo del Ocho, and El Botija from Los Caquitos and Chespirito.

Life and career
The son of engineer Ángel Vivar and Celia Villanueva Falconi, Vivar started his acting career in 1964 as a theater actor. He toured the United States with some of his plays. This gave him vast experience in the acting field. In 1970, Chespirito needed a robust person to play Señor Barriga ("Mr. Beliarge" in Spanish) as well as Ñoño in his upcoming Televisa production of El Chavo del 8, and Vivar was hired for the job.

Both shows became major international hits, allowing Vivar to become known beyond Mexico and to tour all over Latin America, Spain and the United States. He also made an attempt at becoming a telenovela actor, participating in his co-star Florinda Meza's production, Alguna vez Tendremos Alas.

His weight caused him serious heart-related issues after the half-hour Chespirito productions were over in 1980 (it is believed that his temporary absence from the show may have related to his weight; and was explained that his character, el Botija, had gone to a weight-loss clinic.) In 1992, he left the hour-long Chespirito program briefly for therapy at a weight-loss clinic. He lost a great amount of weight, which helped save his life. He kept touring the countries where Chespirito shows were kept on television as re-runs after the show was over.

In 2006, Vivar appeared in the film Bandidas as a bank manager. He also co-starred in a telenovela made in Argentina, Amarte Así, that became a major success in South America, Spain, and the US. He had a role in Guillermo del Toro's production of El Orfanato, filmed in Spain and released in October 2007. The same year, he voiced Auguste Gusteau in the Latin American version of Disney-Pixar's Ratatouille. He later voiced Dug in Up (2009).

In 2008, Vivar underwent gastric bypass surgery at a clinic in Colombia, and lost approximately 165 pounds. Following his surgery, he has become an advocate for healthy living, particularly for overcoming obesity.

Following his weight loss surgery, Vivar retired all of his Chespirito characters, stating that because of his weight loss, they were no longer appropriate. He would, however, reprise the voices of Señor Barriga and his son Ñoño for an episode of the animated adaptation of El Chavo, the only cast member from the original series to do so.

Filmography

Film

Television

References

1944 births
Chespirito actors
Living people
Male actors from Mexico City
Mexican male film actors
Mexican male stage actors
Mexican male television actors